Canterbury is a civil parish in York County, New Brunswick, Canada.

For governance purposes it was divided (before 2023) between the villages of Canterbury and Meductic and the local service districts of Benton and the parish of Canterbury, all of which are members of the Western Valley Regional Service Commission (WVRSC).

Origin of name
The parish was named in honour of John Manners-Sutton, Lieutenant Governor of New Brunswick at the time and later 3rd Viscount Canterbury following the death of his brother. Manners Sutton Parish (originally Manners-Sutton) was erected at the same time.

History
Canterbury was erected in 1855 from Dumfries Parish. An oversight omits Falls Island in the Saint John River, leaving it outside the boundaries of both Canterbury and Dumfries.

In 1879 the rear of Canterbury was erected as North Lake Parish.

In 1957 Fall Island in the Saint John River was stated to belong to Canterbury.

Boundaries
Canterbury Parish is bounded:

 on the north by the Carleton County line, running through Eel River, then by the Saint John River;
 on the east by the eastern line of a grant to Abraham Lint, west of Allandale Road;
 on the southeast by a line beginning at the southeastern corner of the Lint grant and running southeasterly to the northern end of Palfrey Lake, paralleling the southeastern lines of other parishes south of the Saint John River;
 on the west and northwest by a line running up Big La Coote Stream to La Coote Lake, then running north-northwesterly across land to Third Eel Lake, then down Eel River, including Second Eel Lake and First Eel Lake, to the Carleton County line.

Communities
Communities at least partly within the parish. bold indicates an incorporated municipality

 Benton
  Canterbury
 Carroll Ridge
 Dead Creek
 Deer Lake
 Dorrington Hill
 Dow Settlement
 Eel River Lake
  Hartin Settlement
 Johnson Settlement
 Marne
  Meductic
 Middle Southampton
 Ritchie
 Scott Siding
  Skiff Lake
 Temple

Bodies of water
Bodies of water at least partly within the parish.

 Eel River
  Saint John River
 Pokiok Reach
 Big La Coote Stream
 Little La Coote Stream
 Pocowogamis Stream
 Shogomoc Stream
 Dead Creek
 Sullivan Creek
  Mactaquac Lake
  Palfrey Lake
  Skiff Lake
 more than twenty other officially named lakes

Islands
Islands at least partly within the parish.

 Burnt Island
 Carr Island
 Club Island
 Dibblees Island
 Halfway Island
 Mill Island
 Northcott Island
 Wilson Island

Other notable places
Parks, historic sites, and other noteworthy places at least partly within the parish.

 Big Falls Protected Natural Area
 Dead Creek Protected Natural Area
 Eel River Falls
 Eel River Protected Natural Area
 Estey Wetlands Protected Natural Area
 First Eel Lake Protected Natural Area
 Maxwell Protected Natural Area
 Oak Mountain Protected Natural Area
 Pocowogamis Stream Protected Natural Area
 Risteen Brook Protected Natural Area
 Skiff Lake Protected Natural Area

Demographics
Parish population total does not include the former incorporated village of Canterbury and the portion within the former incorporated village of Meductic. Revised census figures based on the 2023 local governance reforms have not been released.

Population
Population trend

Language
Mother tongue (2016)

See also
List of parishes in New Brunswick

Notes

References

Parishes of York County, New Brunswick
Local service districts of York County, New Brunswick